Jonathan (Hebrew:  Yəhōnāṯān or  Yōnāṯān; "Yahweh has gifted") is a figure in the Book of Samuel of the Hebrew Bible. In the biblical narrative, he is the eldest son of King Saul of the Kingdom of Israel, and a close friend of David. He is described as having great strength and swiftness (2 Samuel 1:23) and excelling in archery (2 Samuel 1:22) and slinging (1 Chronicles 12:2).

Conflicts with Saul
Jonathan first appears in the biblical narrative as the victor of Geba, a Philistine stronghold (1 Samuel 13), while in the following chapter he carries out a lone and secret attack on another Philistine garrison, demonstrating his "prowess and courage as a warrior." However, he eats honey without knowing that his father had said, "Cursed be any man who eats food before evening comes" (1 Samuel 14:24). When he learns of his father's oath, Jonathan disagrees with the wisdom of it, as it requires the soldiers to pursue the enemy although weak from fasting. Saul decides to put Jonathan to death for breaking the ban, but relents when the soldiers protest. 

The story of David and Jonathan is introduced in Samuel 1 (18:1), where it says that "Jonathan became one in spirit with David, and he loved him as himself". The feeling is expressed before the men exchanged a single word in an interaction that has been described as philia or love at first sight. The relationship between David and Jonathan has also been compared more explicitly to other homoerotic relationships in Near Eastern literature, including by the Near Eastern scholar Cyrus H. Gordon, who noted the instance in the Book of Jashar, excerpted in Samuel 2 (1:26), in which David "proclaims that Jonathan's love was sweeter to him than the love of a women" as being similar to Achilles' comparison of Patroclus to a girl and Gilgamesh's love for Enkidu "as a woman".

Saul suspects that Jonathan is colluding with David, who he believes is conspiring to overthrow him. Saul insults Jonathan calling him the "... son of a perverse and rebellious woman!" in 1 Samuel 20:30. Saul even goes so far as to attempt to kill Jonathan by throwing a javelin at him during a fit of paranoid rage. But, before this event happened, all Jonathan did was ask his father what did David do to him so that he would be put to death? (1 Sam. 20:32-33), which suggests David had never wronged Saul.

The last meeting between Jonathan and David would take place in a forest of Ziph at Horesh, during Saul's pursuit of David. There, the two would make a covenant before the Lord before going their separate ways.

Death

Jonathan died at the battle of Mount Gilboa along with his father and brothers (1 Samuel 31). His bones were buried first at Jabesh-gilead, (1 Samuel 31:13) but were later removed with those of his father and moved to Zelah.  Jonathan was the father of Mephibosheth, to whom David showed special kindness for Jonathan's sake (2 Samuel 9).

Cultural symbolism
Jonathan has typically been portrayed as a "model of loyalty to truth and friendship", in the words of T. H. Jones.

He is venerated as a saint by the Roman Catholic Church, with a feast day on 29 December.

Notes

References

Citations

Sources

Further reading
Adam Green, King Saul, The True History of the First Messiah (Lutterworth Press, 2007) – includes a critical literary reassessment of the character and personality of Jonathan and his relationships with Saul and David.

People associated with David
11th-century BCE Hebrew people
Heirs apparent who never acceded
Jewish royalty
House of Saul
Christian saints from the Old Testament
Archers